The Brass Are Comin' is a 1969 album by Herb Alpert & the Tijuana Brass, the group's 13th release and its last album before disbanding in December 1969. It was the first of the group's albums to not achieve gold certification. However, the album reached No. 30 on the Billboard 200 album chart.

Background
Unlike the previous Warm album, which featured much slower-paced songs leaning more toward a Brazilian sound, The Brass Are Comin' is characterized by a western theme with faster-paced songs. "Good Morning, Mr. Sunshine" became one of the most recognized Tijuana Brass songs from the album, and it was among the last Mexican-flavored songs recorded by the group. After completing this album and the subsequent television special, the group embarked on a European tour that marked the last public performances of the original band.

The album spawned a television special by the same name that aired on NBC on October 29, 1969. Clips from the special can be seen on the album's double-fold cover.

Critical reception

In his review for Allmusic, music critic Richard S. Ginell wrote "...stretches of this record reveal a tired group and a leader whose trumpet has lost much of its old zip. Even so, as on all TJB albums, there are several gems."

Track listing

References

1969 albums
Herb Alpert albums
Albums produced by Herb Alpert
Albums produced by Jerry Moss
A&M Records albums